Reid's base line is used for an unambiguous definition of the orientation of the human skull in conventional radiography, computer tomography (CT), and magnetic resonance imaging (MRI) studies. It is defined as a line drawn from the inferior margin of the orbit (Orbitale point) to the auricular point (center of the orifice of the external acoustic meatus, Auriculare point) and extending backward to the center of the occipital bone. Reid's base line is used as the zero plane in computed tomography. Paediatric base line is an anatomic line that maintains a fixed relation to facial bones throughout the period of growth

In 1962, the World Federation of Radiology defined it as the line between the infraorbital margin and the upper margin of the external auditory meatus. 

With the head upright, it is typically tilted about 7 degrees nose up with respect to the horizontal plane.

See also
 Frankfurt plane

External links
 

Radiology